Mohammed Khalil Maran (born 15 February 2001) is a Saudi professional footballer who currently plays as a forward for Al-Nassr.

Career
Maran began his career at the youth team of Al-Amjad. He joined the youth team of Al-Nassr On 19 August 2019. On 11 January 2020, He was chosen to participate with the first team in Al-Nassr in the Al-Ittihad match . On 28 February 2021, Maran made his professional debut for Al-Nassr against Abha in the Pro League, replacing Pity Martínez. On 31 August 2021, Maran joined Al-Tai on loan.

Honours

International
Saudi Arabia U23
AFC U-23 Asian Cup: 2022
WAFF U-23 Championship: 2022

References

External links

2001 births
Saudi Arabian footballers
Saudi Arabia youth international footballers
Saudi Arabia international footballers
Living people
Al-Amjad FC players
Al Nassr FC players
Al-Tai FC players
Saudi Professional League players
People from Jizan Province
Association football forwards